Matip is a surname. Notable people with the surname include:

Joël Matip (born 1991), Cameroonian footballer
Marie-Claire Matip (born 1938), Cameroonian writer
Marvin Matip (born 1985), German-born Cameroonian footballer